JOMO Cup was a all-star game between the all-star team of K League and all-star team of J.League.

Japan Energy Corporation whose filling stations are branded as JOMO sponsored this all-star game.

It was held in 2008 and 2009 then ceased.

Games

2008

2009

Broadcasters 
 Japan
 TV Asahi (2008–2009)

 South Korea 
 KBS N Sports (2008)
 SBS TV (2009)

See also
K League All-Star Game
J.League All-Star Soccer

References

External links

All-Star
All-Star
All-star games
Representative teams of association football leagues
All-star game